Edsel K. Schweizer (February 5, 1923 – April 22, 2003) was an American football coach and college athletics administrator. He served as the head football coach at Luther College in Decorah, Iowa from 1952 to 1977, compiling a record of 150–70–6.

Schweizer came to Luther College in 1950, when he was hired as backfield coach for the football team, assistant basketball coach, track coach, dean of students, and instructor in the education department. After a recall to active duty in the United States Marine Corp in 1951, Schweizer returned to Luther in 1952 as head coach in football and track, assistant coach in basketball, and professor of psychology. He also served as the school's athletic director from 1966 until he retired in 1984. Schweizer died of cancer on April 22, 2003.

Head coaching record

College

References

External links
 

1923 births
2003 deaths
Iowa Hawkeyes football players
Luther College (Iowa) faculty
Luther Norse athletic directors
Luther Norse football coaches
Luther Norse men's basketball coaches
Purdue Boilermakers men's basketball players
College track and field coaches in the United States
High school football coaches in Missouri
People from Chester, Illinois
Players of American football from Illinois
Deaths from cancer in Iowa